From Memphis to Vegas / From Vegas to Memphis is the eleventh studio album and the second live album by American singer and musician Elvis Presley. It was released on October 14, 1969, by RCA Records. It is a double album, the first album, titled In Person at the International Hotel, Las Vegas, Nevada, contains the live recordings of Presley's hits at the International Hotel in Winchester, Nevada, while the second album, titled Back in Memphis, contains entirely new material recorded at American Sound Studio in Memphis. The album peaked at No. 12 on the Billboard 200, and was certified Gold on December 13, 1969, by the Recording Industry Association of America.

Content 
Issued to capitalize upon the response to From Elvis in Memphis and its hit singles, and his newfound success as a headliner in Las Vegas, Vegas/Memphis is Presley's first double album and his first official live album. Presley's manager, Colonel Tom Parker, secured a month-long engagement at the International Hotel, and in keeping with the "clear-the-decks" philosophy of the previous album, Presley jettisoned his long-serving 1960s sidemen in favor of musicians who would become his Taking Care of Business band. The musicians used on the second LP were assembled by Chips Moman dating back from early 1969 at the American Sound Studios sessions in Memphis.

The first album consisted of recordings from those shows, Elvis' first live performances since his March 1961 benefit concert in Hawaii. Signature hits from his 1950s and early 1960s repertoire appeared alongside a cover of "Words" by The Bee Gees, his recent hit single "In The Ghetto" and an extended version of "Suspicious Minds", the single of which had only just been released during the engagement.

The second album consisted of ten recordings from the winter of 1969 sessions at American Sound not used for From Elvis in Memphis. Although drawn from what were basically leftovers, still "Stranger in My Hometown" equaled the intensity of the already issued songs. Of these remainders, "The Fair's Moving On" and "You'll Think of Me" had previously appeared as b-sides respectively to "Clean Up Your Own Backyard" and "Suspicious Minds" earlier in the year.

Reissues 
In November 1970, RCA reissued the set as individual albums, only in the US, identified by the subtitles that appeared on the original double LP, In Person at the International Hotel, Las Vegas, Nevada as LSP 4428, and Back in Memphis as LSP 4429. They have been issued separately ever since. However, the double LP LSP 6020 was also available concurrently through the 1970s. In the United Kingdom this has only ever been released as the double LP set , keeping the integrity of the original project. The entirety of Back in Memphis can be found on the box set From Nashville to Memphis: The Essential 60s Masters, and on the double-disc compilation of recordings at American Sound Studio, Suspicious Minds.

On July 28, 2009, Sony Music Entertainment issued Back in Memphis on the second disc of its Legacy Edition of From Elvis in Memphis. A similar Legacy Edition of On Stage released on March 23, 2010, features the entirety of In Person at the International Hotel, Las Vegas, Nevada on its second disc.

The collectors' label Follow That Dream has released several of the full performances from Presley's August 1969 season in Las Vegas. The full August 22 performance was included on a reissue of the live album, titled In Person. The full midnight show from August 23 was released under the title Elvis At The International, while the midnight show from August 26 was released as All Shook Up. The August 24 show is available on the first disc of the 2001 box set Live in Las Vegas. In 2013, FTD released the complete midnight show from August 25.

Track listing

Elvis in Person

Back in Memphis

Personnel 
Elvis in Person at the International Hotel
 Elvis Presley – vocals, electric guitar, acoustic guitar, overdubbed backing vocals on “Johnny B. Goode”
 James Burton – lead guitar
 John Wilkinson − rhythm guitar
 Charlie Hodge − acoustic rhythm guitar, backing vocals
 Larry Muhoberac − keyboards
 Jerry Scheff – bass
 Ronnie Tutt − drums
 Millie Kirkham − backing vocals
 The Imperials − backing vocals
 The Sweet Inspirations − backing vocals
 Bobby Morris and his Orchestra - orchestra

Back in Memphis

 Elvis Presley − vocals, guitar, piano
 Ed Kollis − harmonica
 Reggie Young − electric guitar
 Bobby Wood − piano
 Bobby Emmons − organ
 Tommy Cogbill, Mike Leech − bass
 Gene Chrisman − drums
 Glen Spreen − string and horn arrangements

Overdubbed:
 Wayne Jackson, Dick Steff, R. F. Taylor − trumpets
 Ed Logan, Jack Hale, Gerald Richardson − trombones
 Tony Cason, Joe D'Gerolamo − French horns
 Andrew Love, Jackie Thomas, Glen Spreen, J.P. Luper − saxophones
 Joe Babcock, Dolores Edgin, Mary Greene, Charlie Hodge, Ginger Holladay, Mary Holladay,Millie Kirkham, Ronnie Milsap, Sonja Montgomery, June Page, Susan Pilkington, Sandy Posey,Donna Thatcher, Hurschel Wiginton − backing vocals

Charts

References

External links 

LSP-6020 From Memphis to Vegas / From Vegas to Memphis Guide part of The Elvis Presley Record Research Database

Elvis Presley albums
1969 albums
Albums produced by Felton Jarvis
RCA Records albums
1969 live albums
Elvis Presley live albums
RCA Records live albums
Albums recorded at Westgate Las Vegas